"Greatest Day" is a song by British pop group Take That. It was released through Polydor Records on 24 November 2008 as the lead single from their fifth studio album, The Circus (2008). The song was written by the band and produced by John Shanks.

The song reached number one on the UK Singles Chart, becoming the band's eleventh UK number-one single. It has since been certified Platinum in the United Kingdom selling over 600,000 copies.

Background
"Greatest Day" was written by Take That and produced by John Shanks. The song was written and recorded at Sarm West Studios in Notting Hill and was mixed in Los Angeles at the Jim Henson Studios, Gary Barlow revealed on an episode of The Xtra Factor in 2011 that it took them 3–4 hours to write this song. The song moves in 104 BPM and has a key signature of D flat major.

Critical reception

Digital Spy stated the song was a "grower, sneaking up on you after about seven listens and battering you into submission with its hearty chorus and angelic harmonies". They concluded, however, that the song didn't match up to previous efforts, 'Patience', 'Shine' or 'Rule The World'. The BBC also made reference to previous releases they felt were stronger, noting the chorus failed to deliver. 

Birmingham Live gave the song a positive review, regarding it an album standout, and noting similarities in the structure and style to Coldplay. The Sunday Mercury said: "Hit single Greatest Day is as pop-perfect now as Patience was back in 2006."

Music video
The video for "Greatest Day" was filmed on location on top of the 28-story California Bank & Trust building at 550 South Hope Street in Downtown Los Angeles. It was directed by Meiert Avis, who previously shot videos for U2, Damien Rice, Bruce Springsteen and Bob Dylan. and produced by Jeremy Alter. The band shot the video while visiting producer John Shanks in the city who was mixing the album. It shows the band performing the song as they look on the sun setting in LA before they are beamed up into a light as the song finishes. The video premiered on AOL on 22 October 2008.

Chart performance
"Greatest Day" debuted at number one on the UK Singles Chart upon its release, and became the band's 11th number-one single. It stayed at the top spot for one week before being succeeded by Leona Lewis. In Ireland, the single peaked at number two. The single also charted in the top 40 in Germany, The Netherlands, Denmark and Hungary.

Promotion
Take That performed the song at the MTV Europe Music Awards 2008 on 6 November 2008, the first pan-European live performance by the band, preceding the single's release on 24 November 2008. The song was then premiered to a UK audience on The X Factor where they had a Take That themed song week, which the band opened on Saturday night.

The band also performed the song live at Children in Need 2008 on the BBC on 14 November 2008, before donating £250,000 to the charity. Take That performed "Greatest Day" at the 2009 Brit Awards. They performed the song live whilst upon a UFO stage prop but as the prop descended into the audience they were claimed to have lip synced. It was revealed after in Take That/Take Two that the technical people said they could not sing live as they were on the UFO stage prop. This was because of where they were positioned, which was right in front of the speakers, and if they had then the mics would have fed back.

Personnel
Gary Barlow – lead vocals
Howard Donald – backing vocals
Jason Orange – backing vocals
Mark Owen – backing vocals

Track listings
UK CD single
 "Greatest Day" (radio mix) – 4:01
 "Sleepwalking" – 3:43

German CD single
 "Greatest Day" (radio mix) – 4:01
 "Sleepwalking" – 3:43
 "Here" – 3:41
 "Greatest Day" (video) – 4:01

Charts and certifications

Weekly charts

Year-end charts

Certifications

In popular culture
In March 2014, a re-recorded version of the song—featuring vocals from Barlow and other pop singers such as Eliza Doolittle, Katy B and Spice Girls members Melanie C and Emma Bunton, and former footballers such as Gary Lineker and Michael Owen – was announced as the official song for the England football team at the 2014 World Cup in Brazil. A music video of the song was shown during Sport Relief and uploaded onto YouTube, but it was never released as a single.

The song was chosen via an online poll as the first song to be played on the rebranded Hits Radio (formerly Key 103).

References

2008 singles
Take That songs
Songs written by Gary Barlow
Songs written by Mark Owen
Songs written by Jason Orange
Songs written by Howard Donald
Music videos directed by Meiert Avis
England national football team songs
England at the 2014 FIFA World Cup
2008 songs
Song recordings produced by John Shanks
UK Singles Chart number-one singles